The following is a list of characters that first appeared in the British soap opera Emmerdale in 1978 and 1979, by order of first appearance.

Seth Armstrong

Meg Armstrong

Meg Armstrong is the wife of Seth Armstrong and mother of his sons, Jimmy and Fred. She appeared periodically from 1979 to 1986.

Meg is first seen when her eldest son Jimmy and his fiancé come to stay with them after years living away from home. Meg is happy to see her son despite differences between Jimmy and his parents. Meg is initially portrayed as a downtrodden housewife but in her later appearances she is a highly religious woman, who Seth finds hard to live with. His nickname for her is "poppet". She gets a job as cleaner at The Woolpack pub and accidentally breaks Henry Wilks' favourite pipe. Henry and Amos Brearly decide to fire her but she resigns from her job before they can do so. This is Meg's last onscreen appearance. But she is mentioned several times by Seth over the following years.

Meg dies in February 1993, of a possible stroke, and Seth finds it hard to cope. The villagers help him out with the housework to try to make it easier for him.

References 

1978
, Emmerdale
Television characters introduced in 1979